Dalton is a village and civil parish in North Yorkshire in England. Dalton is situated about six miles north-west of Richmond and about five miles south-east of Barnard Castle within the council district of Richmondshire and close to the A66 trans-Pennine trunk road. It was listed in the Domesday book.  The Dalton parish boundary includes the village itself as well the houses at Dalton Heights (off the road to Newsham) plus numerous surrounding farms. The population of the parish was 147 according to the 2001 census, increasing to 181 at the 2011 Census.

Dalton includes a farming community, both arable and stock, and is sited on a stream or beck which is a tributary of the River Swale. The Dalton & Gayles Village Hall, which is shared with the neighbouring village of Gayles, is located in Dalton; there is also a Church of England church, St James's, built in 1897.

The name Dalton comes from Old English and means farmstead or village in a valley.

To the South of Dalton there are the remains of a camp called ‘Castle Steads’, and further south there is a block of stone called ‘Stone Man’ which used to be a landmark, until the stones were taken away to make fences. A mile south-east of the Stone Man, a stone chest was found which had a ‘kale pot’, said to have contained money.

In 1835, an allowance of £40 was given to the schoolmaster by the Kirby-Ravensworth hospital for the education of the poor children.  By 1890, there was a mixed school attended by 50 students.

References

External links
 
 

Villages in North Yorkshire
Civil parishes in North Yorkshire